Li Zhe and Gonçalo Oliveira were the defending champions but only Oliveira chose to defend his title, partnering Yang Tsung-hua. Oliveira lost in the first round to Andrey Golubev and Aleksandr Nedovyesov.

Gonzalo Escobar and Miguel Ángel Reyes-Varela won the title after defeating Gong Maoxin and Zhang Ze 6–3, 6–3 in the final.

Seeds

Draw

References

External links
 Main draw

Doubles
2020 ATP Challenger Tour